Lonnie Sims (born April 21, 1970) is an American politician who has served in the Oklahoma House of Representatives from the 68th district since 2018.

References

1970 births
Living people
Republican Party members of the Oklahoma House of Representatives
21st-century American politicians